Mississippi Highway 370 (MS 370) is a state highway in northeastern Mississippi. It is split into three distinct sections, with the first running from Ashland at MS 5 to MS 15 at Falkner, the second running from MS 4 in Ripley to MS 30 in Pleasant Ridge, and the third and final section running from MS 9 and MS 30 near Jericho to Kirkville at MS 371.

Route description

Western segment

MS 370 begins in Benton County in Ashland at a large intersection with MS 5. It heads straight through downtown along Ripley Avenue before leaving Ashland and winding its way east through wooded hilly terrain for several miles to cross into Tippah County. The highway now enters farmland for a few miles before entering Falkner, where it comes to an end at an intersection with MS 15 just south of downtown.

Central segment
MS 370 begins again in Tippah County in the eastern outskirts of Ripley at an intersection with MS 4. It travels southeast through rural hilly areas to pass through Dumas before entering Union County and ending up at Pleasant Ridge, where it comes to an end Aton intersection with MS 30.

Eastern segment
MS 370 begins again in Union County just south of Graham at an intersection with MS 30 and MS 9. While the middle and eastern sections of the highway are not connected, there is signage along MS 30 pointing to MS 4 south stating "To MS 370" but signage along the MS 4 concurrency itself indicating that it's part of mainline MS 370. MS 4 and MS 370 head south along Naaman Branyan Memorial Highway through a wooded/brush-lined area. MS 4 breaks off the concurrency leaving MS 370 to continue south as an unsigned highway, though signage along the road indicates that it is maintained by the county as Union County Route 170 (CR 170). The road winds its way through wooded terrain to pass through Jericho.

In Jericho, MS 370 briefly travels southwest along CR 171 before the road turns due east onto a state-maintained road where signage for MS 370 resumes. It briefly crosses into Prentiss County before crossing into Lee County to pass through Bethany. Inside the city limits, a diamond interchange with U.S. Route 45 (US 45) is present. MS 370 now enters downtown, curves slightly to the south to fully reenter Lee County, and has a short concurrency with MS 145 (4th Street). Along the concurrency, the two roads travel northeast into Prentiss County.

The highway now leaves Baldwyn along East Clayton Street. At first, the highway is city-maintained and travels southeast, then heads east along the Prentiss-Lee county line again. At East Street, state maintenance resumes. Continuing east, it has an intersection with MS 366, where MS 370 turns southeast and later crosses into Itawamba County. MS 370 now enters Kirkville, where it comes to an end at an intersection with MS 371, near that highway's intersection with the Natchez Trace Parkway.

None of Mississippi Highway 370 is included in the National Highway System.

Major intersections

References

External links

370
Transportation in Benton County, Mississippi
Transportation in Tippah County, Mississippi
Transportation in Union County, Mississippi
Transportation in Prentiss County, Mississippi
Transportation in Lee County, Mississippi
Transportation in Itawamba County, Mississippi